ICON at South Beach is a residential enclave tower /skyscraper in Miami Beach, Florida's South Beach.  It is located directly on Biscayne Bay on the Miami Beach Marina.  The tower, which opened in 2004, is 423 ft (129 m) tall and has 42 floors.  It is located in the "SOFI" (South of Fifth Street) neighborhood.

It is the sixth tallest skyscraper in Miami Beach.

Icon on South Beach was designed by Philippe Starck and developed by the Related Group of Florida.

See also
List of tallest buildings in Miami Beach

References

Residential buildings completed in 2004
Residential skyscrapers in Miami Beach, Florida
2004 establishments in Florida